Gillette House may refer to:

Francis Gillette House, Bloomfield, Connecticut, listed on the NRHP in Hartford County, Connecticut 
Guy M. and Rose (Freeman) Gillette House, Cherokee, Iowa, listed on the NRHP in Cherokee County, Iowa
Callaway-Gillette House, Cuero, Texas, listed on the NRHP in DeWitt County, Texas 
Gillette House (Houston, Texas), NRHP-listed

See also
Edwards-Gillette Barn, Cambridge, Idaho, listed on the NRHP in Washington County, Idaho